Pontefract was a semi-professional rugby league club based in Pontefract, a market town within the City of Wakefield in West Yorkshire, England.

The club joined the Northern Union in 1903–04 and played for a total of three full seasons until 1905–06. The following season 1906–07 saw them resign early into the season and the club folded.

History 

The club joined the Rugby League 2nd Division for the 1903-04 season finishing 10th out of 17 and scoring 24 points more than they conceded.

They continued in the 2nd Division for the following season 1904-05, their second season.

The third season, 1905-06, was spent in the enlarged league finishing 19th out of 31 and scoring 23 points more than they conceded.

The following season 1906-07 saw Pontefract resign from the league after eight matches and the club folded. Their record was expunged.

Club League Record 
The league positions for Pontefract for the 3 full seasons (plus the fourth part season) in which they played semi-professional rugby league are given in the following table :-

Heading Abbreviations
RL = Single Division; Pl = Games played; W = Win; D = Draw; L = Lose; PF = Points for; PA = Points against; Diff = Points difference (+ or -); Pts = League points
% Pts = A percentage system was used to determine league positions due to clubs playing varying number of fixtures and against different opponents 
League points: for win = 2; for draw = 1; for loss = 0.

Fixtures & results 
The following is one of Pontefract's fixtures during the five season (and other times) in which they played semi-professional rugby league :-

Notes and Comments 

 Warrington’s record in the Challenge Cup in 1903-04 is Preliminary Round Beat Swinton 20-0 at Wilderspool (16/03/04) after 0-0 draw at Swinton's Chorley Road (12/03/04)
 Round 1 Beat Wigan at Wilderspool 3-0 (19/03/04) 
 Semi-Final Beat Bradford 8-0 on neutral ground (20/04/04) after 3-3 draw (16/04/04) Final Lost to Halifax 3-8 at The Willows, Salford (30/04/04)
 In 1886 Swinton moved into their Chorley Road ground. They remained there until 1929 when they moved to what was to become the large International standard ground at Station Road, quite near their original .
 On Saturday 8 September 1906, Swinton hosted a Pontefract team who arrived with only 12 players. The Lions scored 18 tries in a club record 76-4 victory. This record would stand for ninety years.

See also 
 British rugby league system
 Cumberland League
 Rugby league county leagues
 Swinton - early history
 List of defunct rugby league clubs

References

External links 
1896–97 Northern Rugby Football Union season at wigan.rlfans.com
Hull&Proud Fixtures & Results 1896/1897
Widnes Vikings - One team, one passion Season In Review - 1896-97
Saints Heritage Society
Folly Field
Normanton Knights History
Eastmoor Dragons ARLFC - Club Info - History 2

Rugby league teams in West Yorkshire
Defunct rugby league teams in England
Sport in Pontefract